Dame Lauren Chantelle Bluebelle Gazelle Roselle Alesha Masheka Funeshka Tanesha Felicia Jane Harry Kane Liam Payne Cooper is a fictional character in The Catherine Tate Show. Lauren is one of the show's main characters and is portrayed by Catherine Tate. The character was "killed off" in the 2007 Christmas Special which aired on 25 December.

Lauren is a 15-year-old schoolgirl with a surly attitude and was most widely known for her phrase "Am I bovvered?" (i.e. "bothered" pronounced with th-fronting). When feeling angry or embarrassed, she frequently replies with defensive responses such as "Am I bovvered?", "Do I look bovvered?" or "Are you disrespecting me?", among others. As demonstrated through her clothing and mannerisms, Tate portrays Lauren as a caricature of a chav.

She claimed to have been made a Dame at the end of her sketch on the Royal Variety Performance 2005.

The Catherine Tate Show
In series one, sketches feature Lauren arguing with authority figures such as train conductors and teachers, as well as her best friend Liese Jackson (played by Niky Wardley) and love interest Ryan Perkins (played by Mathew Horne). She normally utters her trademark catchphrases only after being provoked or embarrassed. Lauren is one of the most popular characters with fans, and is arguably the most recognizable from the show. She is listed as "Fly Girl" on the series one DVD.

In series two, Lauren becomes more offensive than ever before. One notable change is that Lauren starts being insulting without provocation, while in the past, her catchphrase of "Am I bovvered?" was only used after she believed that she had been wronged in some way. She is now aged 15 and, according to one of her teachers, in grave danger of leaving school with no GCSEs.

In the 2005 Christmas special, her singing is revealed as poor when she, Liese and Ryan as "the Flygirl Collective and MC Perkins" audition for Fame Academy. In their audition, they sing their own rendition of "Shut Up" by The Black Eyed Peas which is poorly received by Richard Park.

In series three, she spends the summer holidays working at "Billy's Burger Bar". Her attitude at school remains the same as before. She has a new rival for Ryan's affections, a girl called Kelly, (played by Natalie Cassidy), and falls for a fake marriage proposal from Ryan. She is due to marry Ryan in the final episode, but he jilts her at the altar because of his embarrassment of Lauren after she sings a very squeaky, off-key version of Celine Dion's "My Heart Will Go On" to him. Lauren even insulted the reverend by using her catchphrase as well as calling her a lesbian and being transgender and stating that god doesn’t exist.

Despite Lauren's blatant disregard for authority, and chav-like demeanor, she sometimes shows surprising intelligence. She is well-versed in the Periodic table, she apparently knows Shakespeare, as shown in the sketch in Comic Relief 2009 with David Tennant playing her Scottish literature teacher, knows how to say "Am I bovvered?" in British Sign Language, and she even speaks French, once surprising her French teacher by asking her "Regardez mon visage. Suis-je bovvered? Est-ce que vous appelez ma mère une pikey? Est-ce que vous appelez mon père un gypo?" ("Look at my face. Am I bovvered? Are you calling my mum a pikey? Are you calling my dad a gypo?"), although she refuses to speak any French for her oral exam.

Other appearances
Lauren made an appearance during the BBC's Comic Relief telethon in March 2005. The sketch features fans of McFly asking the group questions. Lauren decides to ask them: "Why are you so rubbish?" When told by Simon Amstell, who is hosting the segment, that only positive questions are allowed, Lauren uses a variety of her catch phrases, including "Am I bovvered?" ("I ain't McBovvered") and continues to question them in a harsh manner. Lauren is then "ordered" to put a more positive question to the group, and confuses them with Busted, asking "Are you gutted that Charlie left?" She is told to leave the set, and as she does so, she asks Danny Jones from McFly to sign her knee, but walks away promptly saying "You can't even spell."

In November 2005, Lauren appeared in a sketch for the Children in Need telethon. The sketch is a crossover with EastEnders. The scene is set when Lauren arrives in Walford in search of revenge on Stacey Slater, who has apparently stolen her boyfriend. She looks for her in the launderette, where she finds Little Mo Mitchell, who tells her that Stacey is not there. She then visits the Queen Vic, and Peggy Mitchell finds herself getting increasingly frustrated and annoyed with Lauren, who asks, "Are you a Cockney? Are you a Cockney sparrow?" (pronounced "cockerney"). Peggy then orders Lauren out of her pub with immediate effect.

In November 2005, Lauren was a featured sketch at the 77th Royal Variety Performance. After Lauren embarrasses herself in front of the audience, Ryan points out that the Queen is laughing at her. Looking up at the Royal Box, she asks "Are you disrespecting me?" and mimicks the Queen's accent, asking, "Is one bovvered?". She receives a phone call, answers timidly "Hello, yes, thank you." and hangs up. When asked who it was, she announces "I've just been made a dame."

On 16 March 2007, Tate appeared twice on Comic Relief as Lauren. Guests in the sketches included David Tennant. Tennant plays her new English teacher, Mr. Logan, who after being goaded by Lauren for his Scottish accent and resemblance to The Doctor, is finally pushed over the edge when she asks him if he fancies Billie Piper. He threatens to fail her, and Lauren proceeds to do her "Am I bovvered?" routine in Shakespearean style "Amest I bovvered, forsooth?" with many other famous lines changed "looketh at my face" followed by a recitation of Sonnet 130 off the top of her head ending with a definitive "Bite me alien boy". Mr. Logan then reveals he actually is the Doctor, as he produces the sonic screwdriver from inside his jacket and turns her into a 5" Rose Tyler action figure with it, misquoting Romeo and Juliet by saying "A Rose by any other name would smell as sweet". The figure proclaims that it "still ain't bovvered". Tony Blair also makes a cameo appearance, when Lauren is on work experience at Downing Street. Upon Lauren attempting to tell Blair who the most famous person she had met was, he asks her if he is "bovvered", much to the astonishment of Lauren. He then instructs her to "look at his face" and acknowledge that "no part of it is bovvered". He then orders her out of his office, prompting Lauren to shout back that the most famous person she has met is Ross Kemp.

"Death"
In the 2007 Christmas special of The Catherine Tate Show, Lauren dies after falling from a waterfall while kayaking, having ignored warnings from a local man, after asking him "Are you a yokel?" and "Is your cousin your mum? Is your dad your brother? Are you your own father?" At the end of the episode, Liese and Ryan are seen standing beside her gravestone that says:

Reprise 

The character was revived in 2017 for Red Nose Day and appears on stage with Lenny Henry and Warwick Davis. She also returned in The Big Night In, a 20 April 2020 telethon held during the COVID-19 pandemic, in a skit which had her being schooled remotely by a teacher played again by David Tennant.

Influence
In 2006, Lauren's catchphrase word "bovvered" was named Word of the Year. A spokesperson for the OED commented: "Am I bovvered?" and its follow-up, "Does my face look bovvered?" had already come to be seen as the perfect expression of a generation of teenagers and their speaking style. 

Alan Carr spoofed Lauren in a sketch on Catherine Tate's episode of The Friday Night Project.

In a recurring spoof on NBC's Late Night with Jimmy Fallon, Jimmy Fallon performs in character as a vampire version of Robert Pattinson talking about things that bother him whilst in a tree.

A 2016 update to the Oxford English Dictionary added the word "bovver", which had been current since 1871, and had been "made famous by comedian Catherine Tate".

See also
List of The Catherine Tate Show characters

References

Female characters in television
The Catherine Tate Show characters
Television characters introduced in 2004
Fictional singers